The Camellia School of Business Management is located in  Kolkata, India. It is a business school providing postgraduate programmes in Management (Master of Business Administration) - MBA. It was founded in 2007 by the Camellia Educational and Manpower Development Trust. Mr N.R Dutta is the chairman.

Educational programmes

The school provides a two-year full-time MBA divided into four semesters affiliated under West Bengal University of Technology and approved by 

MBA full-time in HR, Systems, Finance and Marketing.

References 

Colleges affiliated to West Bengal University of Technology
Business schools in Kolkata
2007 establishments in West Bengal
Educational institutions established in 2007